Erzsébet Bartos (née Heldt; born 31 January 1941) is a former Hungarian sprinter. She competed in the women's 100 metres at the 1964 Summer Olympics.

References

External links
 

1941 births
Living people
Athletes (track and field) at the 1960 Summer Olympics
Athletes (track and field) at the 1964 Summer Olympics
Hungarian female sprinters
Olympic athletes of Hungary
Athletes from Budapest
Olympic female sprinters